Hamam (also spelled Hammam or Hemame) is a village in the Kumlu District of Hatay Province, Turkey. The population of Hamam was 31 as of 2012.

References

Villages in Hatay Province
Kumlu District